TMNT: Teenage Mutant Ninja Turtles (Music from the Motion Picture) is the licensed soundtrack to the 2007 Warner Bros. film TMNT. It was released by Atlantic Records on March 20, 2007.

Album information
Unlike its predecessor soundtracks from 1990, 1991, and 1993 which featured overall hip hop and techno themes, this collection features a pop punk and emo theme. Keeping in the tradition it features two score cues from the film by composer Klaus Badelt.

Track listings

References

Music from the Motion Picture
2007 soundtrack albums
Superhero film soundtracks
Teenage Mutant Ninja Turtles (1990 film series)